was a province of Japan in the area of central Kyoto and east-central Hyōgo Prefectures. Tanba bordered on Harima, Ōmi, Settsu, Tajima. Tango, Wakasa, and Yamashiro provinces. In terms of the Gokishichidō system, Tanba was one of the provinces of the San'indō circuit. Under the Engishiki classification system, Tanba was ranked as one of the "superior countries" (上国) in terms of importance, and one of the "near countries" (近国) in terms of distance from the capital. The provincial capital is believed to have been located in what is now the city of Kameoka, although the exact location remains uncertain. The ichinomiya of the province is the Izumo-daijingū also located in Kameoka.

History
Before the establishment of the Ritsuryō system, the area was under control of the Tanba Kokuzō and included both the Tanba and Tango areas. The province of Tango was created in 713 during the reign of Empress Genmei by separating the northern five districts (Kasa District, Yoza District, Tamba District (later Naka District), Takeno District, and Kumano District) into "Tango", and the districts closer to the capital as "Tanba". The Tanba area is rugged, and can be roughly divided into several river basins separated by mountains. For this reason, historically the province has been difficult to govern as a whole. On the other hand, its proximity to the capital gave it a strategic importance. During the Muromachi period, the Hosokawa clan were the shugo of the province, but governed through their proxies, the Naito clan. During the late Sengoku period, the province was conquered by Akechi Mitsuhide, and after his defeat by Toyotomi Hideyoshi at the Battle of Yamasaki in the aftermath of the assassination of Oda Nobunaga, it was governed by a succession of relatives of the Toyotomi clan. In the Edo Period, Tanba was governed by a mosaic of mostly fudai daimyō domains, who were considered more reliable by the Tokugawa shogunate and who could be called upon when necessary for the defense of Kyoto and Osaka.

Meiji period
Following the Meiji restoration, Tanba was divided into six districts.  Per the early Meiji period , an official government assessment of the nation’s resources, the province had 970 villages with a total kokudaka of 331,954 koku.

Gallery

Notes

References
 Nussbaum, Louis-Frédéric and Käthe Roth. (2005).  Japan encyclopedia. Cambridge: Harvard University Press. ;  OCLC 58053128
 Titsingh, Isaac. (1834).  Annales des empereurs du Japon (Nihon Ōdai Ichiran).  Paris: Royal Asiatic Society, Oriental Translation Fund of Great Britain and Ireland. OCLC 5850691.

External links 

  Murdoch's map of provinces, 1903

Former provinces of Japan
Tanba Province